Yuraq P'ukru (Quechua yuraq white, p'ukru hole, pit, gap in a surface, "white hole", also spelled Yuraj Phujro) is a mountain in the Andes of Bolivia which reaches a height of approximately . It is located in the Potosí Department, Nor Chichas Province, Cotagaita Municipality. Yuraq P'ukru lies at the Atocha River, northwest of the village of Quechisla.

References 

Mountains of Potosí Department